Hassan Rana (born Hassan Waqas Rana), also known as Doc, is a Pakistani film director, producer and screenwriter. He is best known for his debut production Waar, for which he won 3 awards at 1st ARY Film Awards. He is the founder of MindWorks Media.

Breach of Contract
 
Hassan Rana was later not honorably acquitted of all the allegations leveled against him,  both by the Pakistani police as well as the courts of Pakistan, saying that the said allegation was baseless and no evidence to prove the claim of Bilal Lashari was produced at any forum. Hassan Waqas Rana was recently booked under an FIR (First Information Report) with the Pakistani police by the director of Waar, Bilal Lashari for keeping Waar's profits for himself. Apparently, he transferred all cinema earnings to his personal account.

Filmography

Awards and nominations

ARY Film Awards 
2014: Winner, ARY Film Award for Best Film for Waar
2014: Winner, ARY Film Award for Best Action for Waar
2014: Winner, ARY Film Award for Best Special Effects for Waar

References

External links 
 

Pakistani film directors
Pakistani film producers
Living people
Punjabi people
Year of birth missing (living people)